Atef El Tayeb (  ) (26 December 1947 – 23 June 1995) was an  Egyptian film director.
Alternative transliterations of his name are: Atef Al-Tayeb and Attef El Taieb. 
His films often depicted the struggles of ordinary people.

Filmography

As director
 Leila Sakhina (A Hot Night) (1994)
 Did el Hokouma (Against the Government) (1992)
 Nagi El-Ali (1991)
 El Heroob (Escape) (1988)
The Innocent (1986)
 El Zamar (The Piper) (1985)
 Al Hob Fawk Habadet al Haram (Love on the Pyramids Plateau) (1984)
 The Cell (El-Takhsheeba) (1983)
 Sawak al-utubis (Bus Driver)(1982)

As assistant director
 Sphinx (1981)
 Gallipoli (1981) (assistant director for Egyptian version)
 The Awakening (1980)
 Death on the Nile (1978)
 El-Raghba wel Thaman (Desire and Price) (1978)
 The Spy Who Loved Me (1977)
 Da'wa Lil Hayah (A Call for Life) (1972)

References

External links

1947 births
1995 deaths
Egyptian film directors